The original Vancouver Canucks were a minor league professional ice hockey team in the Pacific Coast Hockey League and the Western Hockey League, based in Vancouver, British Columbia, Canada. Inaugurated in 1945 with the PCHL, they became a WHL team with the merger of the PCHL with the Western Canada Senior Hockey League in 1952. The Canucks played 25 seasons in the WHL between 1945 and 1970. In 1970 they joined the National Hockey League along with fellow expansion team, the Buffalo Sabres.

The Vancouver Canucks won six President's/Lester Patrick Cups (the trophy was renamed in 1960 after the death of Lester Patrick), two PCHL titles (1946 and 1948) and four WHL titles (1958, 1960, 1969 and 1970). They were also regular season champions four times.  They played home games in the PNE Forum arena at the Pacific National Exhibition in east Vancouver, before moving for their last two seasons into the Pacific Coliseum just to the north.

Personnel

Players
Five Canucks players have been inducted into the Hockey Hall of Fame.  Andy Bathgate (inducted in 1978) played with Vancouver for four years (1952–54 and 1968–70) and was on the team for their final two championships.  In 1969–70, he recorded 108 points in 72 games, earning the George Leader Cup as league MVP.  Johnny Bower, Tony Esposito, Allan Stanley and Gump Worsley – all Hall of Fame inductees – have all played one season with the Canucks.

Coaches
1948–49: Bill Cowley 
1949–50: Bill Carse 
1950–51: Bill Carse replaced by Murph Chamberlain 
1951–52: Murph Chamberlain; replaced by Hugh Currie; replaced by Joe Carveth 
1959–61: Art Chapman 
1961–62: Phil Maloney (11–35–3); replaced by Hugh Currie (7–13–1) (February 7, 1962) 
1962–63: Max McNab 
1966–67: Bert Olmstead 
1967–68: Jim Gregory 
1968–69: Joe Crozier 
1969–70: Joe Crozier; replaced by Hal Laycoe

General Managers
1948–49: Bill Cowley 
1949–50: Coleman E. Hall 
1950–51: – 
1960–61: Coley Hall 
1961–62: Art Chapman (temp); replaced by Dave Dauphine (after Nov.) 
1962–63: Max McNab 
1967–68: Annis Stukus 
1968–69: Joe Crozier 
1969–70: Joe Crozier; replaced by Bud Poile

Presidents
1948–61: Coleman E. Hall 
1962–63: Fred J. Hume (owner) 
1968–69: Cyrus McLean 
1969–70: Cyrus McLean; replaced by Thomas K. Scallen

Honoured members

Hall of famers
Players
 Andy Bathgate, C, 1952–54 & 1968–70, inducted 1978
 Johnny Bower, G, 1954–55, inducted 1976
 Tony Esposito, G, 1967–68, inducted 1988
 Allan Stanley, D, 1953–54, inducted 1981
 Gump Worsley, G, 1953–54, inducted 1980

WHL league award winners
Players
Leader Cup – MVP
 Emile Francis, G, 1952–53
 Lorne Worsley, G, 1953–54
 Phil Maloney, F, 1955–56
 Hank Bassen, G, 1959–60
 Phil Maloney, F, 1962–63
 Billy McNeill, F, 1964–65
 Billy McNeill, F, 1965–66
 Andy Bathgate, F, 1969–70

Rookie Award
 Orland Kurtenbach, D, 1957–58
 Bruce Gamble, G, 1958–59
 Jim Baird, G, 1961–62
 Gilles Villemure, G,
 Ron Boehm, F, 1966–67
 Brad Selwood, F, 1969–70

Most Gentlemanly Player – Fred J. Hume Cup 
 Phil Maloney, F, 1961–62
 Phil Maloney, F, 1962–63
 Phil Maloney, F, 1967–68

Outstanding Defenseman – Hal Laycoe Cup 
 Larry Cahan, D, 1966–67
 Marc Reaume, D, 1969–70

Leading Scorer Award 
 Phil Maloney, F, 1955–56 (95 points)

Outstanding Goaltender Award
 Emile Francis, G, 1952–53  GA-216  GAA-3.08
 Lorne Worsley, G, 1953–54  GA-168  GAA-2.40
 Johnny Bower, G, 1954–55  GP-63  GA-171  GAA-2.71
 Ray Mikulan, G, 1955–56  GA-181  GAA-2.54
 Marcel Pelletier, G, 1957–58  GA-173  GAA-2.43
 Hank Bassen, G, 1959–60  GA-172  GAA-2.48
 George Gardner, G, 1969–70  GA-171  GAA-2.88

Year by year standings

Note: GP = Games played, W = Wins, L = Losses, T = Ties Pts = Points, GF = Goals for, GA = Goals against

Year by year statistical leaders

Total points (team, season)

 Year        Player            GP   Goals  Assists  Pts   PIM   Leading scorer
 1952–'53    Larry Popein      70     25     44      59    23    Ian MacIntosh, Walt Atanas – 28
 1953–'54    Larry Popein      70     34     32      66    22    Larry Popein
 1954–'55    Doug Adam         67     30     22      52    53    Doug Adam
 1955–'56    Phil Maloney      70     37     58      95    14    Phil Maloney
 1956–'57    Phil Maloney      70     43     55      98     8    Phil Maloney
 1957–'58    Phil Maloney      70     35     59      94     0    Jack McLeod – 44*
 1958–'59    Ted Hampson       66     27     41      68    23    Dan Belisle – 31
 1959–'60    Colin Kilburn     70     23     47      70    79    Jim Powers – 30
 1960–'61    Bruce Carmichael  70     30     47      77    36    and Dan Belisle – 30
 1961–'62    Phil Maloney      70     34     52      86     2    Barrie Ross – 35
 1962–'63    Phil Maloney      69     24     61      90     8    Carl "Buddy" Boone – 44*
 1963–'64    Phil Maloney      65     28     53      81    38    Carl "Buddy" Boone – 38
 1964–'65    Billy McNeill     68     29     59      88    86    and Phil Maloney – 29
 1965–'66    Billy McNeill     72     40     62     102    20    Billy McNeill
 1966–'67    Gordon Vejprava   71     36     46      82    27    Gordon Vejprava
 1967–'68    Phil Maloney      72     22     46      68     6    Bruce Carmichael – 31
 1968–'69    Bob Barlow        74     36     48      84    50    Andy Bathgate – 37
 1969–'70    Andy Bathgate     72     40     68*    108*   66    Paul Andrea – 44*
 * – team record
  Team record for PIM/season   – 251, John Arbor, 1969–'70

Total points (team, playoffs)

 Year        Player              GP   Goals  Assists  Pts   PIM
 1952–'53    Larry Popein         9      5     10      15     0
 1953–'54    Charles McCullough  13      5      8      13     0
 1954–'55    Phil Maloney         5      2      2       4     0
 1955–'56    Phil Maloney        15      8      7      15     4
 1957–'58    Phil Maloney        11      8     17*     25*    4
 1958–'59    (three players tied with 7 points in 9 games)
 1959–'60    Ray Cyr             11      5     11      16    11
 1960–'61    Bruce Carmichael     9      3      3       6     2
 1962–'63    Phil Maloney         7      2      7       9     0
             Robert Kabel         7      5      4       9     2
 1964–'65    Phil Maloney         5      1      5       6     0
             Billy McNeill        5      2      4       6     0
 1965–'66    Larry Cahan          7      4     12      16     4
 1966–'67    Bryan Hextall        8      3      5       8    11
 1968–'69    Bryan Hextall        8      4      7      11    22
 1969–'70    Murray Hall         11     10     11      21    10
             Gerry Glover        11      5     16      21    12
 * – team record
 Team record for goals/playoff – 14, Jack McLeod, 1957–'58
 Team record for PIM/playoff   – 47, Ted McCaskill, 1969–'70

Goaltender stats, season

 Year        Player                GP    GA  EN  SO  GAA    W   L   T   SVS   .PC
 1952–'53    Emile Francis         70   216       5  3.09  32  28  10               – won Outstanding Goalkeeper
 1953–'54    Lorne "Gump" Worsley  70   168       4  2.40  39  24   7               – won Outstanding Goalkeeper
 1954–'55    Johnny Bower          63   171       7  2.71  30  25   8               – won Outstanding Goalkeeper
 1955–'56    Ray Mikulan           71   181          2.54                           – won Outstanding Goalkeeper
 1956–'57    Ray Mikulan           71   231   0   4  3.25               1772  .885
 1957–'58    Marcel Pelletier      71   173   0   8* 2.43               1749  .910* – won Outstanding Goalkeeper
 1958–'59    Bruce Gamble          65   199   2   7  3.06  29  26  20   1630  .891
 1959–'60    Hank Bassen           69   172       5  2.45  44  19   6               – won Outstanding Goalkeeper
 1960–'61    Claude Evans          53   147       6  2.77  27  23   3
 1961–'62    Claude Evans          40   165       2  4.08  11  26   3
             Art LaRiviere         23
 1962–'63    Gilles Villemure      70   228       5  3.26  35  31   4
 1963–'64    Marcel Paille         70   254       2  3.60  26  41   3
 1964–'65    Gilles Villemure      60   212       6  3.46  27  26   6
 1965–'66    Gilles Villemure      69   223       5  3.20  32  34   3
 1966–'67    Don Simmons           72   213   1   7  2.95  38  32   2
 1967–'68    Tony Esposito         63   199   0   4  3.20  25  33   4   
             Jean-Guy Morissette   11    58   0   0  5.45   1   8   1
 1968–'69    George Gardner        53   154   2   2  3.01  25  18   9
             Charlie Hodge         13    32   1   0  2.54   7   2   4
             Al Millar             12    34   0   0  3.52   4   4   1
 1969–'70    George Gardner        60   171   0   3  2.88  41  14   6               – won Outstanding Goalkeeper
             Lynn Zimmerman        13    48   0   0  3.78

Bibliography

External links
 All-time pre-NHL Canucks roster

 
Ice hockey clubs established in 1945
Canucks
Ice hockey teams in British Columbia
WHL
New York Rangers minor league affiliates
California Seals minor league affiliates
Western Hockey League (1952–1974) teams
1945 establishments in British Columbia
1970 disestablishments in British Columbia